In number theory, a kth root of unity modulo n for positive integers k, n ≥ 2,  is a root of unity in the ring of integers modulo n; that is, a solution x to the equation (or congruence) .  If k is the smallest such exponent for x, then x is called a primitive kth root of unity modulo n. See modular arithmetic for notation and terminology.

In fact, these integers are roots of unity modulo  by Euler's theorem, and the other integers cannot be roots of unity modulo , because they are zero divisors modulo .

A primitive root modulo , is a generator of the group of units of the ring of integers modulo .

Roots of unity

Properties 
That is, x and n are coprime.
 If x is a unit, then it is a (primitive) kth root of unity modulo n, where k is the multiplicative order of x modulo n.

Number of kth roots 
It satisfies a number of properties:

  for 
  where λ denotes the Carmichael function and  denotes Euler's totient function
  is a multiplicative function
  where the bar denotes divisibility
  where  denotes the least common multiple
 For prime , . If it were known, then together with the previous law it would yield a way to evaluate  quickly.

Examples 
In this case, there are three cube roots of unity (1, 2, and 4). When  however, there is only one cube root of unity, the unit 1 itself. This behavior is quite different from the field of complex numbers where every nonzero number has k kth roots.

Primitive roots of unity

Properties 
 Every divisor  of  yields a primitive th root of unity. One can obtain such a root by choosing a th primitive root of unity (that must exist by definition of λ), named  and compute the power .
 If x is a primitive kth root of unity and also a (not necessarily primitive) ℓth root of unity, then k is a divisor of ℓ.

Number of primitive kth roots 
It satisfies the following properties:

 
 Consequently the function  has  values different from zero, where  computes the number of divisors.
 
 
  for 
  with  being Euler's totient function
 , i.e. 
 One can compute values of  recursively from  using this formula, which is equivalent to the Möbius inversion formula.

Testing whether x is a primitive kth root of unity modulo n 
By fast exponentiation, one can check that . If this is true, x is a kth root of unity modulo n but not necessarily primitive. In order to exclude this possibility, one has only to check for a few ℓ's equal k divided by a prime. That is, what needs to be checked is:

Finding a primitive kth root of unity modulo n 
Among the primitive kth roots of unity, the primitive th roots are most frequent.
It is thus recommended to try some integers for being a primitive th root, what will succeed quickly.
For a primitive th root x, the number  is a primitive th root of unity.
If k does not divide , then there will be no kth roots of unity, at all.

Finding multiple primitive kth roots modulo n 
Once a primitive kth root of unity x is obtained, every power  is a th root of unity, but not necessarily a primitive one. This yields , which means that  is not a primitive th root of unity because there is the smaller exponent .

That is, by exponentiating x one can obtain  different primitive kth roots of unity, but these may not be all such roots. However, finding all of them is not so easy.

Finding an n with a primitive kth root of unity modulo n 
In what integer residue class rings does a primitive kth root of unity exist? It can be used to compute a discrete Fourier transform (more precisely a number theoretic transform) of a -dimensional integer vector.

A simple way to find such an n is to check for primitive kth roots with respect to the moduli in the arithmetic progression  All of these moduli are coprime to k and thus k is a unit. According to Dirichlet's theorem on arithmetic progressions there are infinitely many primes in the progression, and for a prime , it holds . Thus if  is prime, then , and thus there are primitive kth roots of unity. But the test for primes is too strong, and there may be other appropriate moduli.

Finding an n with multiple primitive roots of unity modulo n 
To find a modulus  such that there are primitive  roots of unity modulo , the following theorem reduces the problem to a simpler one:

 For given  there are primitive  roots of unity modulo  if and only if there is a primitive th root of unity modulo n.

 Proof

Backward direction:
If there is a primitive th root of unity modulo  called , then  is a th root of unity modulo .

Forward direction:
This implies  and this in turn means there is a primitive th root of unity modulo .

References 

Modular arithmetic